Jane Antoinette Scott, Baroness Scott of Bybrook,  (born 13 June 1947) is a British Conservative politician serving as Parliamentary Under-Secretary of State for Faith and Communities since September 2022. She is a member of the House of Lords and was a government whip from 2020 to 2022. She was leader of Wiltshire County Council between 2003 and 2009 and then of its successor the Wiltshire Council unitary authority from June 2009 until July 2019, when she stood down, also retiring as a councillor in February 2020.

Early life
Born on 13 June 1947, Scott was educated at the Convent of Jesus and Mary High School in Harlesden, Brent, London, and then took a diploma in dairying at the Lancashire College of Agriculture, later renamed as Myerscough College.

Career
After college, Scott worked in the dairy industry, on farms and also in public relations work, marketing and lecturing. She moved to Wiltshire in the 1990s and in 1995 was elected to North Wiltshire District Council. Two years later, she was elected to Wiltshire County Council, and in 2001 became chairman of its Education Committee, then cabinet member for children, education and libraries, and finally Leader in 2003. In the county council, she represented the Kington division, and in the district council Kington St Michael.

When chosen to lead Wiltshire County Council in 2003, Scott said: "Being elected leader of the council is a great honour and I intend to devote all of my time and energies to my new responsibilities." For some years, she was a member of the Local Government Association's General Assembly and for a time her name was on the Conservative Party 'A' List of parliamentary candidates. As leader of the county council, from 2007 she successfully argued for a unitary authority for Wiltshire, which would mean the demise of the county's four existing District Councils, facing determined opposition from leading Conservatives, including Eric Pickles and Michael Ancram.

In 2009, in the first elections to a new Wiltshire Council, the unitary authority created by merging the county and its districts, she was elected for a new division called "By Brook". This includes the parishes of Biddestone (with Slaughterford), Castle Combe, Hullavington, Grittleton, Nettleton, North Wraxall, and Yatton Keynell. The Conservatives won 62 of the 98 seats available, and a few days later Scott was elected as the first Leader of the new unitary authority.

Scott was appointed OBE in the 2010 New Year Honours for services to local government.
On 27 August 2015 it was announced that on the nomination of David Cameron she was to be created a life peer, giving her a seat in the House of Lords. She was created Baroness Scott of Bybrook, of Upper Wraxall in the County of Wiltshire, on the afternoon of 8 October. The title refers to the Bybrook River, after which Scott's electoral division of Wiltshire was named.

She was a member of the National Youth Agency and the Wiltshire and Swindon Learning Skills Council. chair of the Wiltshire Strategic Board, and a Local Education Authority Inspector for Ofsted.

In May 2019, Scott announced that she was standing down as Leader of Wiltshire Council with effect from July, and on 10 July 2019, Phillip Whitehead took over from her. She resigned as a councillor in February 2020, and in March  Nick Botterill, a former Leader of the London Borough of Hammersmith and Fulham was selected as the new Conservative candidate for By Brook. He was elected at the 2021 elections.

Private life
In 1986 Scott married Ronald J. Scott, an executive of the International Monetary Fund. They had three children, and until 2013 lived near Chippenham on a livestock farm. After a severe fall from a horse in the 1980s, she took up breeding Caspian horses, and in 1999 her occupation was "horse stud owner". She and her daughter Fleur, a vet, have been active members of the Caspian Breed Society.

See also

1997 Wiltshire County Council election
2001 Wiltshire County Council election
2005 Wiltshire County Council election
2009 Wiltshire Council election
2013 Wiltshire Council election
2017 Wiltshire Council election

Notes

References

External links

Baroness Scott of Bybrook at parliament.uk

1947 births
Living people
Councillors in South West England
Conservative Party (UK) councillors
Conservative Party (UK) life peers
Life peeresses created by Elizabeth II
Members of Wiltshire County Council
Members of Wiltshire Council
Officers of the Order of the British Empire
People from Chippenham
People from Harlesden
Leaders of local authorities of England
Women councillors in England